Superstar is a World Cup ski piste in the northeast  United States at Killington, Vermont. Located on Skye Peak mountain of the Killington Ski Resort, the course is open to the public as a black diamond trail. It has hosted eleven women's World Cup events (45th of all-time), the sixth most in the U.S. The race course debuted in November 2016, succeeding Aspen, Colorado, as the early season U.S. host for women's technical events (slalom and giant slalom).

World Cup
The course has hosted the FIS Alpine Ski World Cup since 2016, replacing Aspen, Colorado, as the early season U.S. venue for women's slalom and giant slalom events. This was the first World Cup event in the northeast since 1991 at Waterville Valley, New Hampshire; and the first in Vermont since 1978 at Stratton Mountain. Unlike the lightly attended World Cup events in the North American West, Killington is a very popular stop, with over 30,000 people attending. Since the course's debut, American Mikaela Shiffrin came in first for five slalom events. 

As a race course, Superstar is comparable to most classic European venues. With the course consisting of the Upper Headwall, Launch Pad, Upper Field, Lower Field, High Road, Upper Preston's Pitch, and Lower Preston's Pitch sections.

Women

Trail
The course is situated on a black diamond trail of the same name, consisting of three separate sections: headwall, middle, and lower, moguls line the side of the trail. It is known for enabling one of the longest ski/snowboard seasons in North America, relying on ambitious snowmaking efforts.

References

External links
 Killington – NewEnglandSkiHistory.com – History and photos

Ski areas and resorts in Vermont
Killington, Vermont